Simon Graves (born 23 November 1967) is a British former race driver who competed in series including the British Touring Car Championship.

In 2001 he won the overall races at Knockhill and Snetterton and finished in seventh in Production Class.

Racing record

Complete British Touring Car Championship results
(key) Races in bold indicate pole position in class (1 point awarded all races) Races in italics indicate fastest lap in class (1 point awarded all races) * signifies that driver lead race for at least one lap in class (1 point awarded just in feature race)

References

English racing drivers
1967 births
Living people